Government Technology magazine is the flagship periodical of Folsom, California-based publishing company e.Republic Incorporated. The magazine contains editorial content about information technology in the public-sector, primarily in state and local government. The magazine was established in 1987.

Government Technology serves branches of the state, county, municipal, special district and federal government as well as government associations.

Government Technology magazine is a considered a trade or business-to-business publication. Circulation, according to e.Republic, was 77,897 at the end of the 2008 fiscal year.

References

External links
 

Computer magazines published in the United States
Monthly magazines published in the United States
Science and technology magazines published in the United States
Magazines established in 1987
Magazines published in California